Manuel Perez Luna (born 1 April 1966 in Málaga) is a wheelchair basketball athlete from Spain.  He has a physical disability: he is a 2-point wheelchair basketball player. He played wheelchair basketball at the 1996 Summer Paralympics. His team was fourth.

References 

Wheelchair category Paralympic competitors
Spanish men's wheelchair basketball players
Paralympic wheelchair basketball players of Spain
Living people
1966 births
Wheelchair basketball players at the 1996 Summer Paralympics
Sportspeople from Málaga
20th-century Spanish people
21st-century Spanish people